The 1990 USC Trojans football team represented the University of Southern California (USC) in the 1990 NCAA Division I-A football season. In their fourth year under head coach Larry Smith, the Trojans compiled an 8–4–1 record (5–2–1 against conference opponents), finished in second place in the Pacific-10 Conference (Pac-10), and outscored their opponents by a combined total of 348 to 274.

USC began the season by beating Syracuse in the eighth Kickoff Classic.  They also won non-conference games against Penn State and Ohio State, the latter of which was suspended with 2:36 remaining because of severe thunderstorms. The Trojans would finish second in the Pac-10 and lost to Michigan State in their bowl game in an outcome reminiscent of their 1987 season.

Quarterback Todd Marinovich led the team in passing, completing 196 of 322 passes for 2,423 yards with 13 touchdowns and 12 interceptions.  Mazio Royster led the team in rushing with 235 carries for 1,168 yards and eight touchdowns. Gary Wellman led the team in receiving with 66 catches for 1,015 yards and five touchdowns.

Schedule

Personnel

Season summary

Syracuse

Penn State

at Washington

at Ohio State

Washington State

at Stanford

Arizona

at Arizona State

California

at Oregon State

at UCLA

60th meeting
Marinovich wasn't named starter until morning of the game

Notre Dame

John Hancock Bowl (vs Michigan State)

References

USC
USC Trojans football seasons
USC Trojans football